Nishigochi Dam  is a gravity dam located in Kumamoto Prefecture in Japan. The dam is used for irrigation. The dam impounds about 1  ha of land when full and can store 22 thousand cubic meters of water. The construction of the dam was started on 1967 and completed in 1970.

See also
List of dams in Japan

References

Dams in Kumamoto Prefecture